The Shire of Karkarooc was a local government area in northwestern Victoria, Australia.

History

Land in Karkarooc was originally within the St Arnaud Road District, from 1861 and the Shire of St Arnaud, from 1864, and then within the Shire of Borung, after its severance from St Arnaud. Parts of the North and West Ridings of Borung severed on 29 May 1896, to form the Shire of Karkarooc. On 29 May 1897, it annexed the northeastern part of Shire of Dimboola, and two days later annexed part of Castle Donnington. On 31 May 1906, it also annexed part of the Tyrrell Riding of the Shire of Wycheproof.

A new shire, Walpeup, was formed in western Victoria on 1 October 1911, taking in some areas of Karkarooc and sections of five other shires. Karkarooc also lost some of its West Riding to Dimboola on 14 December 1932.

On 20 January 1995, the Shire of Karkarooc was abolished, and along with parts of the Shires of Dunmunkle, Warracknabeal and Wimmera, was merged into the newly created Shire of Yarriambiack.

Ridings
At the time of dissolution, Karkarooc was not divided into ridings, and its twelve councillors represented the entire shire.

Towns and localities
 Beulah
 Galaquil
 Gama
 Goyura
 Hopetoun*
 Lascelles
 Patchewollock
 Rosebery
 Speed
 Tempy
 Turriff
 Wathe
 Woomelang
 Wyperfeld
 Yaapeet
 Yarto

* Council seat.

Population

* Estimate in the 1958 Victorian Year Book.

References

External links
 Victorian Places - Karkarooc Shire

Karkarooc